Jerusalem Declaration may refer to:

 The Jerusalem Declaration on Antisemitism, a 2021 guide on antisemitism particularly with regard to Israel and Palestine
 The Jerusalem Declaration on Christian Zionism, a statement issued by Palestinian Christian churches rejecting Christian Zionism
 The Jerusalem Declaration of the Global Anglican Future Conference